Pusher is a 2012 British crime thriller film directed by Luis Prieto. It is an English-language remake of Nicolas Winding Refn's 1996 film of the same name, the second remake following a 2010 Hindi remake. The film stars Richard Coyle, Agyness Deyn, Bronson Webb, and Paul Kaye.

Plot
Frank is a low-level cocaine dealer in London, conducting business with his partner Tony and would-be-girlfriend Flo. When a former cellmate contacts him for a large drug deal, Frank borrows £45,000 of cocaine from Milo, a dangerous Serbian drug lord. He promises to return to Milo with the money the next day, plus £3,000 that he previously owed, but police raid the deal and Frank is forced to dump the cocaine in a duck lake. In custody, Frank is told by police that Tony has confessed to the deal, but they release him the next day. Frank quickly finds Tony and beats him savagely with a baseball bat.

Frank returns to Milo without the cash or the cocaine and requests more time to pay Milo off. Milo demands £55,000 to be paid soon. Frank scrambles to call in old debts and tries to get back in touch with Danaka, a drug mule who is scheduled to return with a half kilo of cocaine. Frank is unsuccessful and becomes increasingly on edge. Milo's henchman Hakan arrives to help Frank strongarm his debtees, but they have no success. Frank finally gets in touch with Danaka, but discovers that the cocaine pack she brought back is worthless. Frank becomes desperate and robs a high-class drug party, but is still far short of the required sum.

Milo's patience runs out and Frank is brought back to him. With only a few thousand pounds to his name Frank begs for more time, but Milo begins to torture him instead. Frank manages to escape and returns to Flo, asking her if she wants to run away with him to Spain using the funds he has gathered up. As Frank makes a few final arrangements, Milo calls and says that their feud has become too costly and will therefore accept a token payment to resolve it. However, we see that Milo and his henchmen are actually planning to kill Frank when he arrives.

Frank brusquely tells Flo that their plans are called off and laughs at the thought of them running away together. Heartbroken, Flo steals all of Frank's remaining cash and escapes in a taxi. Frank catches up to the taxi and the two stare tearfully at each other through the closed car window as the film ends.

Cast
 Richard Coyle as Frank, a mid-level drug-dealer, who works in the London underworld.
 Agyness Deyn as Flo, Frank's girlfriend
 Bronson Webb as Tony, Frank's cheerful partner
 Mem Ferda as Hakan, Milo's enforcer
 Zlatko Burić as Milo, a powerful Serbian drug lord. Burić also played Milo in the original Pusher, and is the only original actor to reprise his role.
 Paul Kaye as Fitz, one of Frank's customers
 Shend as Meten, a nasty piece of work

Soundtrack
The film's score is provided by British electronic band Orbital.

Reception
 
Pusher received mixed reviews. On Rotten Tomatoes, the film received a 47% score, based on 49 critics, with an average rating of 5.4/10. Metacritic gives the film a weighted average score of 52% based on reviews from 19 critics, indicating "mixed or average reviews".

References

External links
 
 
 
 

2012 films
2012 crime thriller films
British crime thriller films
Remakes of Danish films
Films scored by Orbital (band)
Films about cocaine
Vertigo Films films
Films about the illegal drug trade
Films set in London
Films shot in London
Films about the Serbian Mafia
2010s English-language films
Films directed by Luis Prieto
2010s British films
Pusher (film series)